Libuše Průšová (born 13 July 1979) is a former professional Czech tennis player.

In her career, Průšová won eleven singles and six doubles titles on the ITF Circuit. On 21 October 2002, she reached her best singles ranking of world No. 103. On 7 June 2004, she peaked at No. 46 in the WTA doubles rankings.

WTA career finals

Doubles: 1 (runner-up)

ITF finals

Singles (11–7)

Doubles: 17 (6–11)

Performance timelines

Singles

Doubles

References
 
 
 

1979 births
Living people
People from Valašské Meziříčí
Czech female tennis players
Olympic tennis players of the Czech Republic
Tennis players at the 2004 Summer Olympics
Sportspeople from the Zlín Region